Idolatteria is a genus of moths belonging to the subfamily Tortricinae of the family Tortricidae.

Species
Idolatteria bichroma Razowski & Wojtusiak, 2008
Idolatteria cantharopisca Obraztsov, 1966
Idolatteria fasciata Obraztsov, 1966
Idolatteria maon (Druce, 1901)
Idolatteria mimica Razowski & Wojtusiak, 2008
Idolatteria mydros Obraztsov, 1966
Idolatteria ops Razowski & Wojtusiak, 2008
Idolatteria orgias (Meyrick, 1930)
Idolatteria pyropis Walsingham, 1914
Idolatteria simulatrix Walsingham, 1914
Idolatteria xanthocapna (Meyrick, 1930)

See also
List of Tortricidae genera

References

 , 1966: Neotropical Microlepidoptera, XI. Revision of the genus Idolatteria (Lepidoptera: Tortricidae). Proceedings of the United States National Museum 119 (3453): 1-11. Full article: 
 , 2008: Some telochromatic Tortricidae from Western South America (Lepidoptera: Tortricidae). Shilap Revista de Lepidopterologia 36 (142): 209–218.
 , 1914, Biol. Centr.-Am. Lepid. Heterocera 4: 270.
 , 2005, World Catalogue of Insects 5

External links

tortricidae.com

Archipini
Tortricidae genera